Henry Gassaway Kennett (August 29, 1835 – January 6, 1895) was an American politician and lawyer who served as a Union brevet brigadier general during the period of the American Civil War.

Kennett began the war serving a lieutenant colonel for the 27th Ohio.  He later served as a colonel of the 79th Ohio Infantry Regiment and led this regiment in Tennessee. Kennett resigned from the Union army on August 1, 1864.  He was later named a brevet brigadier general with a promotion date of March 13, 1865.  After the war, Kennett served as a member of the Ohio House of Representatives. He died in 1895, in Cincinnati.

His father Colonel John Kennett, who was born in St. Petersburg, Russia, had attended Harvard College, and had co-owned a large tobacco company in Cincinnati, before leading the 4th Ohio Cavalry Regiment from 1861 until 1863.

See also

List of American Civil War generals

References

1835 births
1895 deaths
Members of the Ohio House of Representatives
Union Army generals
United States Army generals